The first USS Ella was a steamer acquired by the Union Navy during the American Civil War. She was used by the Union Navy as a picket and patrol vessel, as well as a dispatch boat, on Confederate waterways.

Construction and design 

Ella, a wooden-hulled sidewheel steamboat, was built in New York in 1859 by Thomas Collyer for the Stamford Line of Stamford, Connecticut.

Service history

Merchant service 

Ella made her maiden voyage on 5 July 1859. She thereafter operated in daily service between New York City and Stamford, departing the latter at 7 am in the mornings and clearing New York at 3 pm the same day.

Naval service  
Ella was purchased at New York City 30 July 1862; outfitted at New York Navy Yard; and commissioned 10 August 1862, Acting Master S. C. Gray in command.

Ella sailed 12 August 1862 for duty with the Potomac Flotilla, and arrived at Fortress Monroe 2 days later. She performed her entire service in Virginia waters as a picket, patrol and dispatch boat, based on the navy yard at Washington, D.C.

After a useful career, she returned to her base for the last time 30 July 1865. She was decommissioned there 4 August and sold 15 September 1865.

Later history 

Redocumented as a merchant steamer on October 19, 1865, Ella later history is unknown. She was last documented about 1875.

References 

Ships of the Union Navy
Ships built in New York City
Gunboats of the United States Navy
Steamships of the United States Navy
Dispatch boats of the United States Navy
American Civil War patrol vessels of the United States